Philinna or Philine was the name of many Greek females, as, for instance, of the female dancer Philinna of Larissa in Thessaly, who was the mother of Philip III Arrhidaeus by Philip II. A first century BC papyrus fragment, the Philinna Papyrus, preserves a spell to cure headaches attributed to one Philinna the Thessalian. It was also the name of the mother of the poet Theocritus (Ep. 3). The name occurs in Aristophanes' drama The Clouds. In the eighteenth century Goethe used it for a character in his novel Wilhelm Meister.

References
Dictionary of Greek and Roman Biography and Mythology
Athenaeus. xiii. p. 557, e ; Photius. Bibl. p. 64. 23.

Ancient Thessalians
Ancient Macedonian queens consort
Ancient Thessalian women
Wives of Philip II of Macedon
Ancient Larissaeans